Acacia debilis, commonly known as the spindly wattle, is a species of Acacia native to eastern Australia.

Description
It has terete longitudinally ridged to smooth glabrous branchlets. The glabrous and thinly leathery seed pods that form after flowering have a white powdery coating and are straight to slightly curved.

Distribution
It is endemic to a small area of south eastern Queensland and north eastern New South Wales and has a disjunct distribution. In New South Wales it is found to the north of the Pilliga scrub usually situated along creek banks and is often part of dry sclerophyll forest or woodland communities and grows in sandy soils. The range of the plant extends from around Taroom in the north down to the Pilliga East State Forest in the south west and Tenterfield in the south east.

See also
 List of Acacia species

References

debilis
Fabales of Australia
Flora of New South Wales
Plants described in 1978
Taxa named by Mary Tindale